Is There Anything About? is the sixth studio album by British jazz fusion group Brand X. It is the last album to feature longstanding members Robin Lumley and Phil Collins. It was assembled from outtakes from the 1979 Product sessions. These sessions produced around twenty tracks which also comprised the Do They Hurt? album (1980). "Modern, Noisy and Effective" is actually the backing track to "Soho" with a new keyboard line overdubbed on it. "A Longer April" is an extended version of "April" from Product, with a bit of synth noise added in the middle. "TMIU-ATGA" is taken from an old cassette tape running in the studio while the band were improvising; the title is an acronym for 'They Make It Up- As They Go Along'.

Track listing

Side one
"Ipanaemia" (Goodsall) – 4:30
"A Longer April" (Giblin) – 7:00
"Modern, Noisy and Effective" (Goodsall, Lumley, Short) – 3:56

Side two
"Swan Song" (Collins, Giblin, Lumley, Short) – 5:37
"Is There Anything About?" (Collins, Goodsall, Jones) – 7:53
"TMIU-ATGA" (Giblin, Lumley, Robinson) – 5:09

Reissue on CD
 "Ipanemia" (Goodsall) – 4:13
 "A Longer April" (Giblin) – 7:23
 "TMIU-ATGA" (Giblin, Lumley, Robinson) – 5:09
 "Swan Song" (Collins, Giblin, Lumley, Short) – 5:37
 "Is There Anything About?" (Collins, Goodsall, Jones) – 7:53
 "Modern, Noisy and Effective" (Goodsall, Lumley, Short) – 3:58

Personnel
 John Goodsall – electric guitar
 Robin Lumley – keyboards, backing vocals
 J. Peter Robinson – keyboards (track 6)
 John Giblin – bass (except track 5), backing vocals
 Percy Jones – bass (track 5)
 Phil Collins – drums, percussion

Additional personnel
 Raphael Ravenscroft – saxophone (track 2)
 Steve Short – syndrums (track 4), backing vocals
 Ed Carson – handclaps (track 3)

Charts

Notes
 This album is outtakes from the Product (1979) sessions. 
 "A Longer April" is a re-engineered version of "April" from the Product (1979) sessions.
 "Modern, Noisy, and Effective" is a recycling of the backing track of "Soho" from the Product (1979) album; that track had been engineered by Collins, who was described as "modern, noisy, and effective".  This phrase, in fact, first appears in the film Three Dates with Genesis (1978); the narrator describes the scene in which the stage has been torn down and all the equipment loaded into trucks thus: "Like the rock band they service, the trucks are noisy, modern, and effective; at 2:30 on a Friday morning, they leave Mannheim to drive halfway across Europe to the Dutch border."

References

External links
 
 

Brand X albums
1982 albums
Passport Records albums
CBS Records albums
Columbia Records albums
Vertigo Records albums
Epic Records albums